The list of commercial failures in video games includes any video game software on any platform, and any video game console hardware, of all time. As a hit-driven business, the great majority of the video game industry's software releases have been commercial disappointments. In the early 21st century, industry commentators made these general estimates: 10% of published games generated 90% of revenue; that around 3% of PC games and 15% of console games have global sales of more than 100,000 units per year, with even this level insufficient to make high-budget games profitable; and that about 20% of games make any profit.

Some of these failure events have drastically changed the video game market since its origin in the late 1970s.  For example, the failure of E.T. contributed to the video game crash of 1983. Some games, though commercial failures, are well received by certain groups of gamers and are considered cult games.

Video game hardware failures

32X 

Unveiled by Sega at June 1994's Consumer Electronics Show, the 32X was later described as the "poor man's entry into 'next generation' games."  The product was originally conceived as an entirely new console by Sega Enterprises and positioned as an inexpensive alternative for gamers into the 32-bit era, but at the suggestion of Sega of America research and development head Joe Miller, the console was converted into an add-on to the existing Mega Drive/Genesis and made more powerful, with two 32-bit central processing unit chips and a 3D graphics processor. Nevertheless, the console failed to attract either developers or consumers as the Sega Saturn had already been announced for release the next year. In part because of this, and also to rush the 32X to market before the holiday season in 1994, the 32X suffered from a poor library of titles, including Mega Drive/Genesis ports with improvements to the number of colors that appeared on screen. Originally released at US$159, Sega dropped the price to $99 in only a few months and ultimately cleared the remaining inventory at $19.95. About 665,000 units were sold.

3DO Interactive Multiplayer 

Co-designed by R. J. Mical and the team behind the Amiga, and marketed by Electronic Arts founder Trip Hawkins, this "multimedia machine" released in 1993 was marketed as a family entertainment device and not just a video game console. Though it supported a vast library of games including many exceptional third party releases, a refusal to reduce its price of  until almost the end of the product's life hampered sales. The success of subsequent next generation systems led to the platform's demise and the company's exit from the hardware market. This exit also included The 3DO Company's sale of the platform's successor, the M2, to its investor Matsushita.

Amstrad GX4000 and Amstrad CPC+ range 

In 1990, Amstrad attempted to enter the console video game market with hardware based on its successful Amstrad CPC range but also capable of playing cartridge-based games with improved graphics and sound. This comprised the Amstrad CPC+ computers, including the same features as the existing CPCs, and the dedicated GX4000 console. However, only a few months later the Mega Drive, a much-anticipated 16-bit console, was released in Europe, and the GX4000's aging 8-bit technology proved uncompetitive. Many of the games are direct ports of existing CPC games (available more cheaply on tape or disc) with few if any graphical improvements. Fewer than thirty games were released on cartridge, and the GX4000's failure ended Amstrad's involvement in the video game industry. The CPC+ range fared little better, as 8-bit computers had been all but superseded by similarly priced 16-bit machines such as the Amiga, though software hacks now make the advanced console graphics and sound accessible to users.

Apple Bandai Pippin 

The Pippin is a game console designed by Apple Computer and produced by Bandai (now Bandai Namco) in the mid-1990s based around a PowerPC 603e processor and Classic Mac OS. It featured a 4x CD-ROM drive and a video output that could connect to a standard television monitor. Apple intended to license the technology to third parties; however, only two companies signed on, Bandai and Katz Media, while the only Pippin license to release a product to market was Bandai's. By the time the Bandai Pippin was released (1995 in Japan, 1996 in the United States), the market was already dominated by the Nintendo 64 and PlayStation. The Bandai Pippin also cost US$599 on launch, more expensive than the competition. Total sales were only around 42,000 units. In 2019, Apple returned to the video game industry with its game subscription service, Apple Arcade, which has proven to be successful.

Atari 5200 

The Atari 5200 was created as the successor to the highly successful Atari 2600. Reasons for the console's poor reception include that most of the games were simply enhanced versions of those played on its predecessor and the awkward design of the controllers, which themselves were also prone to breaking down. The console sold only a little over a million units. When it was discontinued, its predecessor was marketed for several more years, as was its successor, the Atari 7800, which was marketed more carefully to avoid a similar debacle. Nonetheless, the failure of the Atari 5200 marked the beginning of Atari's fall in the console business.

Atari Jaguar 

Released by Atari Corporation in 1993, this 64-bit system was more powerful than its contemporaries, the Genesis and the Super NES (hence its "Do the Math" slogan);  however, its sales were hurt by a lack of software and a number of crippling business practices on the part of Atari senior management. The controller was widely criticized as being too big and unwieldy, with a baffling number of buttons. The system never attained critical mass in the market before the release of the PlayStation and Sega Saturn, and without strong leadership to drive a recovery, it failed and brought the company down with it. Rob Bricken of Topless Robot described the Jaguar as "an unfortunate system, beleaguered by software droughts, rushed releases, and a lot of terrible, terrible games."

Atari Lynx 

Released in 1989 in North America and Europe, and in Japan in 1990, by Atari Corporation, the Atari Lynx is a 16-bit handheld game console that was the world's first handheld electronic game system with a color LCD. The Lynx was the second handheld game system to be released with the Atari name. The system was originally developed by Epyx as the Handy Game. The system is also notable for its forward-looking features, advanced graphics, and ambidextrous layout. In late 1991, it was reported that Atari sales estimates were about 800,000, which Atari claimed was within their expected projections. In comparison, the Game Boy sold 16 million units by later that year. Overall lifetime sales were confirmed as being in the region of 3 million, a commercial failure despite positive critical reviews. In 1996, Atari Corporation merged with JT Storage and ceased all hardware and software production afterward due to the failures of the Lynx and Jaguar consoles.

Atari VCS (2021)

The Atari VCS was developed by Atari Inc. to be a microcontroller that would support numerous Atari games from its console library as well as other Linux-compatible games. Though announced in 2017 and supported by crowdfunding, publicly available units did not ship until June 2021. The console received lukewarm reception, seen as too costly compared to other consoles on the market without providing similar value. Atari reported a drop of about 90% in hardware revenue between 2021 and 2022, leading them to discontinue production of the unit and evaluating other options.

CD-i 

In the 1980s, electronics company Philips together with Sony developed a new CD-based format called CD-i (Compact Disc Interactive) for various multimedia software. The first consumer-oriented player from Philips launched in 1991 with a launch price of $700. Although not technically a game console, Philips increasingly marketed the format as a video game platform from 1994 onwards. It was originally intended to be an add-on for the Super NES, but the deal fell through. Nintendo, however, did give Philips the rights and permission to use five Nintendo characters for the CD-i games. In 1993, Philips released two Zelda games, Link: The Faces of Evil and Zelda: The Wand of Gamelon. A year later, Philips released another Zelda game, Zelda's Adventure, and a few months later, a Mario game titled Hotel Mario. All four of these Nintendo-themed games are commonly cited by critics as being among the worst ever made. Much criticism was also aimed at the CD-i's controller. Although the Philips CD-i was extensively marketed by Philips, consumer interest remained low. Sales began to slow down by 1994, and in 1998, Philips announced that the product had been discontinued. In all, roughly 570,000 units were sold, with 133 games released.

Commodore 64 Games System 

Released only in Europe in 1990, the C64GS was basically a Commodore 64 redesigned as a cartridge-based console.  Aside from some hardware issues, the console did not get much attention from the public, who preferred to buy the cheaper original computer that had far more possibilities.  Also, the console appeared just as the 16-bit era was starting, which left no chance for it to succeed as it was unable to compete with consoles like the Super Nintendo Entertainment System and Mega Drive.

Commodore CDTV 

The CDTV was launched by Commodore in 1991. In common with the Philips CD-i and the 3DO, the CDTV was intended as an all-in-one home multimedia appliance that would play games, music, movies, and other interactive content. The name was short for "Commodore Dynamic Total Vision". The hardware was based on the Amiga 500 computer with a single-speed CD-ROM drive rather than a floppy disk drive, in a case that was designed to integrate unobtrusively with a home entertainment center. However, the expected market for home multimedia appliances did not materialize, and the CDTV was discontinued in 1993, having sold only 30,000 units. Commodore's next attempt at a CD-based console, the Amiga CD32, was considerably more successful.

Dreamcast 

The Dreamcast, released globally in 1999, was Sega's final console before the company focused entirely on software. Although the console was initially successful and management in the company improved significantly after harsh lessons were learned from the Sega Saturn fiasco, the console also faced stiff competition, especially from the technically superior PlayStation 2 despite being in the market over a year ahead. The Dreamcast sold less than the Saturn, coming in at 9.13 million units compared to the Saturn's 9.5 million. The console's development was subject to further stress by an economic recession that struck Japan shortly after the console's release, forcing Sega, among other companies, to cut costs in order to survive.

Fairchild Channel F 

The Fairchild Channel F was a second generation console released in 1976, and the first home console unit to use interchangeable video game cartridges. It had respectable sales within its first year on the market, but soon faced competition from the Atari 2600, another cartridge-based system that was released in September 1977. Whereas the Channel F's games were generally based on intellectual and educational concepts, Atari had crafted games that were conversions of their action-based arcade video game hits, and were more popular, making the Atari 2600 the more popular system. By the end of 1977, the Atari 2600 sold about 400,000 total units compared to the 250,000 units of the Channel F. Fairchild's attempts to make more action-oriented games in 1978 failed to draw consumers to the system, and the console was completely overshadowed. By the time Fairchild sold the console technology to Zircon International in 1979, only 350,000 Channel F units had been sold in its lifetime.

FM Towns Marty 

The FM Towns Marty is a fifth generation console manufactured by Fujitsu. Throughout its few years in the market, the console sold an underwhelming 45,000 units.

Genesis Nomad 

The Nomad, a handheld game console by Sega released in North America in October 1995, is a portable variation of Sega's home console, the Genesis (known as the Mega Drive outside of North America). Designed from the Mega Jet, a portable version of the home console designed for use on airline flights in Japan, Nomad served to succeed the Game Gear and was the last handheld console released by Sega. Released late in the Genesis era, the Nomad had a short lifespan. Sold exclusively in North America, the Nomad was never officially released worldwide, and employs regional lockout. The handheld itself was incompatible with several Genesis peripherals, including the Power Base Converter, the Sega CD, and the Sega 32X. The release was five years into the market span of the Genesis, with an existing library of more than 500 Genesis games.  With the Nomad's late release several months after the launch of the Saturn, this handheld is said to have suffered from its poorly timed launch. Sega decided to stop focusing on the Genesis in 1999, several months before the release of the Dreamcast, by which time the Nomad was being sold at less than a third of its original price. Reception for the Nomad is mixed between its uniqueness and its poor timing into the market. Blake Snow of GamePro listed the Nomad as fifth on his list of the "10 Worst-Selling Handhelds of All Time," criticizing its poor timing into the market, inadequate advertising, and poor battery life.

Gizmondo 

The Gizmondo, a handheld video game device featuring GPS and a digital camera, was released by Tiger Telematics in the UK, Sweden and the U.S. starting in March 2005. With poor promotion, few games (only fourteen were ever released), short battery life, a small screen, competition from the cheaper and more reputable Nintendo DS and PSP, and controversy surrounding the company, the system was a commercial failure. Several high-ranking Tiger executives were subsequently arrested for fraud and other illegal activities related to the Gizmondo. It is so far the world's worst selling handheld console in history, and due to its failure in the European and American video game markets, it was not released in Australia or Japan. Tiger Telematics went bankrupt when it was discontinued in February 2006, just 11 months after it was released.

HyperScan 

Released in late 2006 by Mattel, the HyperScan was the company's first video game console since the Intellivision. It used radio frequency identification (RFID) along with traditional video game technology. The console used UDF format CD-ROMs. Games retailed for $19.99 and the console itself for $69.99 at launch, but at the end of its very short lifespan, prices of the system were down to $9.99, the games $1.99, and booster packs $0.99. The system was sold in two varieties, a cube, and a 2-player value pack. The cube box version was the version sold in stores. It included the system, controller, an X-Men game disc, and 6 X-Men cards. Two player value packs were sold online (but may have been liquidated in stores) and included an extra controller and 12 additional X-Men cards. The system was discontinued in 2007 due to poor console, game, and card pack sales. It is featured as one of the ten worst systems ever by PC World magazine.

LaserActive 

Made by Pioneer Corporation in 1993 (a clone was produced by NEC as well), the LaserActive employed the trademark LaserDiscs as a medium for presenting games and also played the original LaserDisc movies. The LD-ROMs, as they were called, could hold 540 MB of data and up to 60 minutes of analog audio and video. In addition, expansion modules could be bought which allowed the LaserActive to play Genesis and/or TurboGrafx-16 games, among other things. Very poor marketing combined with a high price tag for both the console itself ($969 in 1993) and the various modules (e.g., $599 for the Genesis module compared to $89 for the base console and $229 for Sega CD add-on to play CD-ROM based games) caused it to be quickly ignored by both the gaming public and the video game press. Less than 40 games were produced in all (at about $120 each), almost all of which required the purchase of one of the modules, and games built for one module could not be used with another. The LaserActive was quietly discontinued one year later after total sales of roughly 10,000 units.

Neo Geo CD 

Released in Japan and Europe in 1994 and a year later in North America, the Neo Geo CD was first unveiled at the 1994 Tokyo Toy Show. Three versions of the Neo Geo CD were released: a front-loading version only distributed in Japan, a top-loading version marketed worldwide, and the Neo Geo CDZ, an upgraded, faster-loading version released in Japan only. The front-loading version was the original console design, with the top-loading version developed shortly before the Neo Geo CD launch as a scaled-down, cheaper alternative model. The CDZ was released on December 29, 1995 as the Japanese market replacement for SNK's previous efforts (the "front loader" and the "top loader"). The Neo Geo CD had met with limited success due to it being plagued with slow loading times that could vary from 30 to 60 seconds between loads, depending on the game. Although SNK's American home entertainment division quickly acknowledged that the system simply was unable to compete with the 3D-able powerhouse systems of the day like Nintendo's 64, Sega's Saturn and Sony's PlayStation, SNK corporate of Japan felt they could continue to maintain profitable sales in the Japanese home market by shortening the previous system's load-times. Their Japanese division had produced an excess number of single speed units and found that modifying these units to double speed was more expensive than they had initially thought, so SNK opted to sell them as they were, postponing production of a double speed model until they had sold off the stock of single speed units. As of March 1997, the Neo Geo CD had sold 570,000 units worldwide. Although this was the last known home console released under SNK's Neo Geo line, the newly reincarnated SNK Playmore relaunched the Neo Geo line with the release of the Neo Geo X in 2012. In April 2019, SNK announced at a conference in Seoul that they plan to release a Neo Geo 2 console and later a Neo Geo 3. They plan for the Neo Geo 2 to be a semi open platform console, where they will be built in games, as well as additional games that can be purchased separately. These are planned to be spiritual successors to the original Neo Geo arcade and home systems.

Neo Geo Pocket and Pocket Color 

The two handheld video game consoles, created by SNK, were released between 1998–99 through markets dominated by Nintendo. The Neo Geo Pocket is considered to be an unsuccessful console, as it was immediately succeeded by the Color, a full color device allowing the system to compete more easily with the dominant Game Boy Color handheld, and which also saw a western release. Though the system enjoyed only a short life, there were some significant games released on the system. After a good sales start in both the U.S. and Japan with 14 launch titles (a record at the time) subsequent low retail support in the U.S., lack of communication with third-party developers by SNK's American management, the craze about Nintendo's Pokémon franchise, anticipation of the 32-bit Game Boy Advance, as well as strong competition from Bandai's WonderSwan in Japan, led to a sales decline in both regions. Meanwhile, SNK had been in financial trouble for at least a year – the company soon collapsed, and was purchased by American pachinko manufacturer Aruze in January 2000. Eventually on June 13, 2000, Aruze decided to quit the North American and European markets, marking the end of SNK's worldwide operations and the discontinuation of Neo Geo hardware and software there. The Neo Geo Pocket Color (and other SNK/Neo Geo products) did however, last until 2001 in Japan. It was SNK's last video game console, as the company filed for bankruptcy on October 22, 2001. Though commercially failed, the Neo Geo Pocket and Pocket Color had been regarded as influential systems. It also featured an arcade-style microswitched 'clicky stick' joystick, which was praised for its accuracy and being well-suited for fighting games. The Pocket Color system's display and 40-hour battery life were also well received. Although these were the last known systems released under SNK's Neo Geo line, the newly reincarnated SNK Playmore relaunched the Neo Geo line with the release of the Neo Geo X in 2012. In April 2019, SNK announced at a conference in Seoul that they plan to release a Neo Geo 2 console and later a Neo Geo 3. They plan for the Neo Geo 2 to be a semi open platform console, where they will be built in games, as well as additional games that can be purchased separately. These are planned to be spiritual successors to the original Neo Geo arcade and home systems.

N-Gage 

Made by the Finnish mobile phone manufacturer Nokia, and released in 2003, the N-Gage is a small handheld console, designed to combine a feature-packed mobile/cellular phone with a handheld games console. The system was mocked for its taco-like design, and sales were so poor that the system's price dropped by $100 within a week of its release. Common complaints included the difficulty of swapping games (the cartridge slot was located beneath the battery slot, requiring its removal) and the fact that its cellphone feature required users to hold the device "sideways" (i.e. the long edge of the system) against their cheek. A redesigned version, the N-Gage QD, was released to eliminate these complaints. However, the N-Gage brand still suffered from a poor reputation and the QD did not address the popular complaint that the control layout was "too cluttered". The N-Gage failed to reach the popularity of the Game Boy Advance, Nintendo DS, or the Sony PSP. In November 2005, Nokia announced the failure of its product, in light of poor sales (fewer than three million units sold during the platform's three-year run, against projections of six million). Nokia ceased to consider gaming a corporate priority until 2007, when it expected improved screen sizes and quality to increase demand. However, Nokia's presence in the cell phone market was soon eclipsed by the iPhone and later Android phones, causing development to gravitate to them and sealing the fate of the N-Gage brand. In 2012, Nokia abandoned development on the Symbian OS which was the base for N-Gage and transitioned to Windows Phone.

Nintendo 64DD 

A disk drive add-on and Internet appliance for the Nintendo 64, it was first announced at 1995's Nintendo Shoshinkai game show event (now called Nintendo World). The 64DD was repeatedly and notoriously delayed until its release in Japan on December 1, 1999. Nintendo, anticipating poor sales, sold the 64DD through mail order and bundled with its Randnet dialup subscription service instead of directly to retailers or consumers. As a result, the 64DD was supported by Nintendo for only a short period of time and only nine games were released for it. It was never released outside Japan.  Most 64DD games were either cancelled entirely, released as normal Nintendo 64 cartridges or ported to other systems such as Nintendo's next-generation GameCube. Upon announcement of the cancellation of Randnet in 2001, Nintendo reported a total of 15,000 current 64DD users on Randnet.

Nuon 

The Nuon was a DVD decoding chip from VM Labs that was also a fully programmable CPU with graphics and sound capabilities. The idea was that a manufacturer could use the chip instead of an existing MPEG-2 decoder, thus turning a DVD player into a game console. A year after launch only eight games were available. One game, Iron Soldier 3, was recalled for not being compatible with all systems.

Ouya 

The Ouya is an Android-based microconsole released in 2013 by Ouya, Inc. Even though the Ouya was a success on Kickstarter, the product was plagued by problems from the beginning. The console was very slow to ship and suffered hardware issues.  On top of this, the console had a very limited library of games. The critical reception ranged from lukewarm to outright calling the console a scam. Just two years after its release, Ouya was in a dire financial situation and negotiated a buyout with Razer. Razer continued to run software services for Ouya until June 2019, after which the company deactivated all accounts and online services, rendering most apps unusable.

PC-FX 

The PC-FX is the successor to the PC Engine (aka TurboGrafx-16), released by NEC in late 1994. Originally intended to compete with the Super Famicom and the Mega Drive, it instead wound up competing with the PlayStation, Sega Saturn, and Nintendo 64. The console's 32-bit architecture was created in 1992, and by 1994 it was outdated, largely due to the fact that it was unable to create 3D images, instead utilizing an architecture that relied on JPEG video. The PC-FX was severely underpowered compared to other fifth generation consoles and had a very low budget marketing campaign, with the system never managing to gain a foothold against its competition or a significant part of the marketshare. The PC-FX was discontinued in early 1998 so that NEC could focus on providing graphics processing units for the upcoming Sega Dreamcast. Around this time, NEC announced that they had only sold 100,000 units with a library of only 62 titles, most of which were dating sims. It was never released outside Japan.

PlayStation Classic 

Following the release of Nintendo's NES Classic Edition and SNES Classic Edition, microconsoles that included over 20 preloaded classic games from those respective systems, Sony followed suit with the PlayStation Classic. Like the Nintendo systems, the PlayStation Classic was presented as a smaller form factor of the original PlayStation preloaded with 20 games. The system was heavily criticized at launch. For nine of the games, it used PAL versions (favored in European markets) rather than NTSC, meaning they ran at a slower 50 Hz clock compared to the 60 Hz used in the Americas, which caused notable frame rate problems and impacted the gameplay style for some of the more highly-interactive titles. The emulation also lacked the feature set that Nintendo had set with its microconsoles. The included game list, while varied by region, also was noted to lack many of the titles that had made the original PlayStation successful, and had a heavy focus on the early games on the console. Some of these absences were attributed to intellectual rights (for example, Activision holding the rights to Crash Bandicoot, Spyro the Dragon, and Tony Hawk's), but other omissions were considered odd and disappointing.

PlayStation Vita 

Sony's second major handheld game console, the PlayStation Vita, was released in Japan in 2011 and in the West the following year. The successor to the PlayStation Portable, Sony's intent with the system was to blend the experience of big budget, dedicated video game platforms with the trend of mobile gaming. With a relatively low price, a robust launch title assortment, and a strong debut, analysts predicted the Vita would be a success. However, sales tanked shortly after release; for instance, during Christmas 2011, sales saw a 78% drop in Japan. By 2018, when Sony announced it would end physical game production for the system, the Vita had sold less than 15 million units. Hardware production for the Vita ended entirely in March 2019, and Sony does not plan to release a successor. GamesIndustry.biz attributed the Vita's failure to a number of factors, including competition from smartphones and Nintendo's rival 3DS platform, its design being too conceptually similar to the PSP, and a general lack of support from Sony and other developers.

PSX (DVR) 

Built upon the PlayStation 2, the PSX enhanced multimedia derivative was touted to bring convergence to the living room in 2003 by including non-gaming features such as a DVD recorder, TV tuner, and multi-use hard drive. The device was considered a failure upon its Japanese release due to its high price and lack of consumer interest, which resulted in the cancellation of plans to release it in the rest of the world.  Not only was it an unsuccessful attempt by Sony Computer Entertainment head Ken Kutaragi to revive the ailing consumer electronics division, it also hurt Sony's media convergence plans.

Sega Saturn 

The Sega Saturn was the successor to the Genesis as a 32-bit fifth-generation console, released in Japan in November 1994 and in Western markets mid-1995. The console was designed as a competitor to Sony's PlayStation, released nearly at the same time. With the system selling well in Japan and Sega wanting to get a head start over the PlayStation in North America, the company decided to release the system in May instead of September 1995, which was the same time the PlayStation was going to be released in North America. This left little time to promote the product and limited quantities of the system available at retail. Sega's release strategy also backfired when, shortly after Sega's announcement, Sony announced the price of the PlayStation as being $100 less than the list price for the Saturn. The console also suffered from behind the scenes management conflicts and a lack of coordination between the Japanese and North American branches of the company, leading to the Saturn to be released shortly after the release of the 32X, which created distribution and retail problems. By the end of 1996, the PlayStation had sold 2.9 million units in the U.S., with only 1.2 million units sold by the Saturn. With the added competition from the subsequent release of the Nintendo 64, the Saturn lost market share in North America and was discontinued by 1999. With lifetime sales estimated at 9.5 million units worldwide, the Saturn is considered a commercial failure. The cancellation of a game in the Sonic the Hedgehog series, known in development as Sonic X-treme, has been considered a significant factor in the console's struggle to find an audience. The impact of the failure of the Saturn carried over into Sega's next console, the Dreamcast. However, the console gained interest in Japan and was not officially discontinued until December 7, 2000.

Stadia 

Google released Stadia, a cloud gaming platform using the power of its existing data centers, in November 2019. Players could access games through web browsers, Chromecast devices, or on mobile platforms. In addition to partnering with several developers to release titles on Stadia, Google created its own Stadia Games and Entertainment division with Jade Raymond as its lead, along with acquired a handful of existing studios. Unlike prior streaming options where players had access to the full set of titles for a monthly subscription fee, Google opted to have players buy each game they wanted to play, in addition to offering a subscription tier that offered free games. This approach did not obtain significant traction with users, and by February 2021, the company closed down Stadia Games and shuttered the studios it had acquired, stating that it took too much significant investment to develop games, and instead would continue to focus on bringing other titles to the service. After another troubled year, Google stated in February 2022 they would be working to use Stadia's technology as a white-label product for corporate partners, such as delivering game demos over streaming technology. In September 2022, Google announced they were shuttering Stadia as a consumer product, with the service to go offline in January 2023 and supplying refunds for those that purchased equipment, subscriptions and games. Google said "it hasn't gained the traction with users that we expected" as the reason for the shutdown, though intended to use the technology in its other business sectors. Game journalists believed that Google did not make Stadia a unique offering with nearly no exclusives, escalated by the shutting down of its studios, and requiring players to repurchase games at full price to play them on the service. Stadia also failed to offer a latency advantage over other streaming services that was promised when announced, and Google had been slow to roll out Stadia internationally, remaining behind GeForce Now and Xbox Cloud Gaming as of February 2022.

uDraw GameTablet 

The uDraw GameTablet is a graphics tablet developed by THQ for use on seventh generation video game consoles, which was initially released for the Wii in late 2010. Versions for the PlayStation 3 and Xbox 360 were released in late 2011. THQ also invested in several games that would uniquely use the tablet, such as uDraw Pictionary. The Wii version had positive sales, with more than 1.7 million units sold, prompting the introduction of the unit for the other console systems.  These units did not share the same popularity; 2011 holiday sales in North America fell $100 million below company targets with more than 1.4 million units left unsold by February 2012. THQ commented that if they had not attempted to sell these versions of uDraw, the company would have been profitable that respective quarter, but instead suffered an overall $56 million loss. Because of this failure, THQ was forced to shelve some of its less-successful franchises, such as the Red Faction series. THQ would eventually file for bankruptcy and sell off its assets in early 2013.

Vectrex 

Though its independent monitor could display only monochrome visuals, the console's vector-based graphics and arcade-style controller with analog joystick allowed developers to create a strong games library with faithful conversions of arcade hits and critically praised exclusives.  However, its release shortly before the video game crash of 1983 doomed it to an early grave.

Virtual Boy 

 This red monochromatic 3-D "virtual reality" system was widely panned by critics and failed due to issues related to players getting eye strain, stiff necks, nausea, and headaches when playing it, along with the console's price and lack of portability. It came out in 1995 and was Nintendo's first failed console release. Gunpei Yokoi, the designer of the platform and the person largely credited for the success of the original Game Boy handheld and the Metroid series of games, resigned from the company shortly after the Virtual Boy ceased sales in order to start his own company, although for reasons unrelated to the console's success. The Virtual Boy was included in a Time "50 Worst Inventions" list published in May 2010.

Wii U

Nintendo's Wii U was released in November 2012. It was designed as successor to the Wii to provide a more sophisticated experience and draw back "core" gamers that had dismissed the Wii, which they found was aimed for casual gameplay. The Wii U features the GamePad, the unit's primary controller with a touchscreen allowing for dual-screen play similar to the Nintendo DS line, or can be used for off-TV play. Though the Wii U received positive coverage, it had low sales of fewer than 14 million units by the end of 2016 compared to the Wii's lifetime of 101 million units. Nintendo executives attributed the poor sales of the Wii U to a combination of factors. They admitted their messaging of the Wii U's abilities had not been clear, leading to a general perception that the unit was primarily a tablet system or an add-on to the original Wii rather than a new home console. They also recognized a failure to manage their game release schedule, and to garner significant support from third-party publishers and developers, leaving the Wii U library with gaps in software releases. Nintendo stated an expectation to sell 100 million Wii U units, and this over-estimation of sales contributed to several financial quarters of losses through 2016. Nintendo's next console, the Nintendo Switch, became a "make or break" product for the company due to the Wii U's failure, according to Reggie Fils-Aimé, and its development and marketing avoided several of the pitfalls that occurred for the Wii U; The Switch proved successful quickly, outselling the lifetime sales of the Wii U within nine months of its release. The Wii U was discontinued worldwide on January 31, 2017, a month before the Nintendo Switch was released.

Video game software failures 

The following is an incomplete list of software that have been deemed commercial failures by industry sources.

APB: All Points Bulletin 

APB: All Points Bulletin was a multiplayer online game developed by Realtime Worlds in 2010. The game, incorporating concepts from their previous game Crackdown and past work by its lead developer David Jones, who had helped create the Grand Theft Auto series, was set around the idea of a large-scale urban battle between Enforcers and Criminals; players would be able to partake in large-scale on-going missions between the two sides. The game was originally set as both a Microsoft Windows and Xbox 360 title and as Realtime Worlds' flagship title for release in 2008, but instead the company set about developing Crackdown first, and later focused APB as a Windows-only title, potentially porting the game to the Xbox 360 later. Upon launch in June 2010, the game received lukewarm reviews, hampered by the existence of a week-long review embargo, and did not attract the expected number of subscribers to maintain its business model. Realtime Worlds, suffering from the commercial failure of the game, sold off a second project, Project MyWorld, and subsequently reduced its operations to administration and a skeleton crew to manage the APB servers while they attempted to find a buyer, including possibly Epic Games who had expressed interest in the title.  However, without any acceptable offers, the company was forced to shut down APB in September 2010. Eventually, the game was sold to K2 Network, a company that has brought other Asian massive-multiplayer online games to the Western markets as free-to-play titles, and similar changes occurred to APB when it was relaunched by K2.

Babylon's Fall 

Babylon's Fall is an online action role-playing game developed by PlatinumGames and published by Square Enix for the PlayStation 4, PlayStation 5 and PC. The game was PlatinumGames' first attempt at a live service game, and was described as an attempt to combine the combat system featured on Nier: Automata with multiplayer, although the game can also be played solo. Originally teased at E3 2018, Babylon's Fall would suffer a multitude of delays away from its initial planned 2019 release date, with the game being further delayed by the COVID-19 pandemic.

Upon its eventual release on March 3, 2022, Babylon's Fall was met with little fanfare and received generally negative reviews from critics and players, many who criticised the game's lacklustre mechanics and combat, with several critics calling the game overpriced. The concurrent player count for Babylon's Fall only peaked at 1,179 on release day, and player numbers declined rapidly afterwards; by April 13, 2022, it was reported that the game's player count had fallen to below 10 concurrent players, and on May 4, 2022, the player count reportedly dropped to a single player. On September 13, 2022, merely six months after the game's release, Square Enix announced that they would be ending support for Babylon's Fall on February 27, 2023, and suspended digital sales of the game and in-game currency, despite initially promising that they were intending to support the game in the long-term. Babylon's Fall's commercial failure was described by Forbes as "one of the biggest mainstream misses we’ve seen in recent memories", with TechRadar also naming the game "[Square Enix]'s biggest disaster of the year". Despite the game's failure, PlatinumGames CEO Atsushi Inaba later said that the failure of Babylon's Fall did not affect any of the company's plans to continue expanding into live service games, and also attributed some of Babylon's Fall's faults to the separate developments of the core game and the live service elements between PlatinumGames and Square Enix, respectively.

Battlecruiser 3000AD 

One of the most notorious PC video game failures, Battlecruiser 3000AD (shortened BC3K) was hyped for almost a decade before its disastrous release in the U.S. and Europe. The game was the brainchild of Derek Smart, an independent game developer renowned for lengthy and aggressive online responses to perceived criticism. The concept behind BC3K was ambitious, giving the player the command of a large starship with all the requisite duties, including navigation, combat, resource management, and commanding crew members. Advertisements appeared in the video game press in the mid-1990s hyping the game as, "The Last Thing You'll Ever Desire."  Computer bulletin boards and Usenet groups were abuzz with discussion about the game. As time wore on and numerous delays were announced, excitement turned to frustration in the online community. Smart exacerbated the negative air by posting liberally on Usenet.  The posts ignited one of the largest flame wars in Usenet history. During the development cycle, Smart refused to let other programmers have full access to his code and continued to change directions as new technology became available, causing the game to be in development for over seven years.

In November 1996, Take-Two Interactive finally released the game, reportedly over protests from Smart.  The game was buggy and only partially finished, with outdated graphics, MIDI music, a cryptic interface, and almost no documentation. Critics and the video game community reacted poorly to the release. Eventually, a stable, playable version of the game was released as Battlecruiser 3000AD v2.0. Smart eventually released BC3K as freeware and went on to create several sequels under the Battlecruiser and Universal Combat titles.

Beyond Good & Evil 

Although critically acclaimed and planned as the first part of a trilogy, Beyond Good & Evil (released in 2003) flopped commercially. Former Ubisoft employee Owen Hughes stated that it was felt that the simultaneous releases of internationally competing titles Tom Clancy's Splinter Cell and Prince of Persia: The Sands of Time and in Europe, XIII (all three published by Ubisoft and all of which had strong brand identity in their markets), made an impact on Beyond Good & Evils ability to achieve interest with the public. The game's commercial failure led Ubisoft to postpone plans for any subsequent titles in the series. A sequel was announced at the end of the Ubidays 2008 opening conference, and an HD version of the original was released for the Xbox 360 and PlayStation 3 via download in 2011. Alain Corre, Ubisoft's Executive Director of EMEA Territories, commented that the Xbox 360 release "did extremely well", but considered this success "too late" to make a difference in the game's poor sales. Beyond Good & Evil 2 was announced at Ubisoft's press conference at E3 2017, fourteen years after the release of the original game.

Brütal Legend 

Brütal Legend is Double Fine Productions' second major game. The game is set in a world based on heavy metal music, includes a hundred-song soundtrack across numerous metal subgenres, and incorporates a celebrity voice cast including Jack Black, Lemmy Kilmister, Rob Halford, Ozzy Osbourne, Lita Ford, and Tim Curry.  The game was originally to be published by Vivendi Games via Sierra Entertainment prior to its merger with Activision. Following the merger, Activision declined to publish Brütal Legend, and Double Fine turned to Electronic Arts as their publishing partner, delaying the game's release. Activision and Double Fine counter-sued each other for breach of contract, ultimately settling out of court. The game was designed as an action adventure/real-time strategy game similar to Herzog Zwei; as games in the real-time strategy genre generally do not perform well on consoles, Double Fine was told by both Vivendi and Electronic Arts to avoid stating this fact and emphasize other elements of the game. With some positive reviews from critics, the game got criticized for its real-time strategy elements that were not mentioned within the pre-release marketing, making it a difficult game to sell to players. Furthermore, its late-year release in October 2009 buried the title among many top-tier games, including Uncharted 2, Batman: Arkham Asylum and Call of Duty: Modern Warfare 2. It only sold about 215,000 units within the first month, making it a "retail failure", and though Double Fine had begun work on a sequel, Electronic Arts cancelled further development.  According to Tim Schafer, president and lead developer of Double Fine, 1.4 million copies of the game had been sold by February 2011.

Conker's Bad Fur Day 

Conker's Bad Fur Day is a 3D platformer by Rare for the Nintendo 64. In it, the player controls Conker, a greedy, hard-drinking squirrel, through levels. While it is visually similar to Rare's previous games like Banjo-Kazooie and Donkey Kong 64, Conker's Bad Fur Day is aimed at mature audiences and features profanity, graphic violence, and off-color humor. The game was originally designed to be family-friendly, but was retooled after prerelease versions of the game were criticized for their similarities to Rare's previous games. Though receiving critical acclaim, Conker's Bad Fur Day performed well below expectations, with only 55,000 copies sold by April 2001. Numerous reasons have been cited for the game's perceived failure to connect with audiences, such as its high cost, advertisements exclusive to the older audience, and its release towards the end of the Nintendo 64's life cycle. Nintendo, which held a minority stake in Rare at the time, also did not actively promote the game. After Microsoft bought out Rare, it re-released the game on the Xbox as Conker: Live and Reloaded which included an online multiplayer component based on part of the original game.

Daikatana 

One of the more infamous failures in modern PC video games was Daikatana, which was drastically hyped due to creator John Romero's popular status as one of the key designers behind Doom. However, after being wrought with massive over-spending and serious delays, the game finally launched to incredibly poor critical reaction because of bugs, lackluster enemies, poor gameplay, and terrible production values, all of which were made worse by its heavy marketing campaign proclaiming it as the next "big thing" in first person shooters.

Dominion: Storm Over Gift 3 

The first title released by Ion Storm, Dominion was a real time strategy title similar to Command & Conquer and Warcraft, based as a spin-off to the G-Nome canon. The game was originally developed by 7th Level, but was purchased by Ion Storm for US$1.8 million.  The project originally had a budget of US$50,000 and was scheduled to be finished in three months with two staff members.  Due to mismanagement and Ion Storm's inexperience, the project took over a year, costing hundreds of thousands of dollars. Dominion was released in July 1998.  It received bad reviews and sold poorly, falling far short of recouping its purchase price, let alone the cost of finishing it. The game divided employees working on Ion's marquee title, Daikatana, arguably leading to the walkout of several key development team members. It put a strain on Ion Storm's finances, leading the once well-funded startup to scramble for cash as Daikatana development extended over several years.

Duke Nukem Forever 

Duke Nukem Forever was an entry in the successful Duke Nukem series, initially announced in 1997, but spent fifteen years in development, and was frequently listed as a piece of vaporware video game software. The initial development with the Quake II Engine began in 1996, and the final game was developed by Gearbox Software, developers of the Borderlands series, and released in 2011. The game was heavily criticized and was named by several sites as their "most disappointing" game for the year. Because of its tangled development process, it is very hard to know which companies made and which lost money over the game. According to Gearbox head Randy Pitchford, the game cost 3D Realms head George Broussard US$20–30 million of his own money. The sales were poorer than expected, causing Take-Two to reduce their profit estimate for the quarter, though later in 2011 stated that Duke Nukem Forever would prove to be profitable for the company.

EarthBound 

EarthBound (1994), the second installment in Nintendo's Mother series of Japanese role-playing games, was released in North America in June 1995. Although Nintendo spent a sizable 2 million on marketing, it sold poorly—around 140,000 copies, as compared to twice as many in Japan. Journalists generally blame EarthBound failure to connect with American audiences on its atypical marketing campaign, which sardonically proclaimed "this game stinks" in reference to foul-smelling scratch and sniff advertisements. The game's poor sales have also been attributed to its simple, cartoonish graphics, the unpopularity of role-playing games at the time, and its high market price. Marcus Lindblom and his team, who translated EarthBound for America, were devastated by the poor sales. As a result, EarthBound sequel Mother 3 (2006) never received an American localization on the basis it would not sell.

Epic Mickey 2: The Power of Two

A sequel to the successful Wii-exclusive platformer Epic Mickey, Epic Mickey 2: The Power of Two was developed by Junction Point Studios and published by Disney Interactive Studios for the Wii, Wii U, Xbox 360, PlayStation 3, PlayStation Vita, and Microsoft Windows. Though heavily advertised and being released on multiple consoles, only 270,000 copies of Epic Mickey 2 were sold in North America, barely a quarter of the original's sales of 1.3 million. The game's failure led to the shutdown of Junction Point and the cancellation of future entries in the Epic Mickey series.

E.T. the Extra-Terrestrial 

Based on Steven Spielberg's popular 1982 movie of the same name and reportedly coded in just five weeks, this Atari 2600 game was rushed to the market for the 1982 holiday season.

Even with 1.5 million copies sold, the sales figures came nowhere near Atari's expectations, as it had ordered production of five million copies, with many of the sold games being returned to Atari for refunds by dissatisfied consumers. It had become an urban legend that Atari had buried the unsold cartridges of E.T. and other games in a landfill in Alamogordo, New Mexico, which was confirmed in 2014 when the site was allowed to be excavated, with former Atari personnel affirming they had dumped about 800,000 cartridges, including E.T. and other poorly-selling games. The financial figures and business tactics surrounding this product are emblematic of the video game crash of 1983 and contributed to Atari's bankruptcy. Atari paid $25 million for the license to produce the game, which further contributed to a debt of $536 million (equivalent to $ billion today). The company was divided and sold in 1984.

Grim Fandango 

Known for being the first adventure game by LucasArts to use three-dimensional graphics, Grim Fandango received positive reviews and won numerous awards. It was originally thought that the game sold well during the 1998 holiday season. However, the game's sales appeared to be crowded out by other titles released during the late 1998 season, including Half-Life, Metal Gear Solid and The Legend of Zelda: Ocarina of Time. Based on data provided by PC Data (now owned by NPD Group), the game sold about 95,000 copies up to 2003 in North America, excluding online sales. Worldwide sales are estimated between 100,000 and 500,000 units by 2012. Developer Tim Schafer along with others of the Grim Fandango development team would leave LucasArts after this project to begin a new studio (Double Fine Productions). Grim Fandangos relatively modest sales are often cited as   a contributing factor to the decline of the adventure game genre in the late 1990s, though the title's reputation as a "flop" is to an extent a case of perception over reality, as Schafer has pointed out that the game turned a profit, with the royalty check he eventually received being proof.  His perspective is that the adventure genre did not so much lose its audience as fail to grow it while production costs continued to rise.  This made adventure games less attractive an investment for publishers; in contrast, the success of first-person shooters caused the console market to boom.  The emergence of new distribution channels that did not rely on the traditional retail model would ultimately re-empower the niche genre. Double Fine has since remastered the game for high definition graphics and re-released it through these channels.

Jazz Jackrabbit 2 

Although reviews for Jazz Jackrabbit 2 were positive, sales were insufficient and resulted in a loss for its publisher Gathering of Developers. This prevented the developers from finding a publisher, thus leading to the cancelation of Jazz Jackrabbit 3 which could have been the franchise's first 3D game.

Kingdoms of Amalur: Reckoning 

Kingdoms of Amalur: Reckoning is an action RPG game released in 2012, developed by 38 Studios and Big Huge Games. 38 Studios had been formed by Curt Schilling initially in Massachusetts. After acquiring Big Huge Games from the failing THQ, the studio secured a  loan guarantee from the economic development board of Rhode Island for establishing 38 Studios within the state and promoting job growth. Kingdoms was generally well-received by critics, and initial sales within the first three months were around 1.3 million. Though impressive, Rhode Island recognized that the title was expected to have hit 3 million units by this point for 38 Studios to pay back the loan. 38 Studios defaulted on one of the loan repayments, leading to a publisher to pull out of a  investment in a sequel. The studio managed to make the next payment, but could not make payroll or other expenses, and shortly later declared bankruptcy by May 2012. Resolving the unpaid loan became a civil lawsuit, and ultimately with the state settling with Schilling and other investors for a  payment, leaving the state around  short on its loan. The rights to Kingdoms eventually fell to THQ Nordic AB, the holding company that came to acquire many of the former THQ properties after their bankruptcy.

The Last Express 

Released in 1997 after five years in development, this $6 million adventure game was the brainchild of Jordan Mechner, the creator of Prince of Persia.  The game was noted for taking place in almost complete real-time, using Art Nouveau-style characters that were rotoscoped from a 22-day live-action video shoot, and featuring intelligent writing and levels of character depth that were not often seen in computer games.  Even with rave reviews, Brøderbund, the game's publisher, did little to promote the game, apart from a brief mention in a press release and enthusiastic statements by Brøderbund executives, in part due to the entire Brøderbund marketing team quitting in the weeks before its release. Released in April, the game was not a success, selling only about 100,000 copies, a million copies short of breaking even.

After the release of the game, Mechner's company Smoking Car Productions quietly folded, and Brøderbund was acquired by The Learning Company, who were only interested in Brøderbund's educational software, effectively putting the game out of print which also caused the PlayStation port to be cancelled after almost being finished for a 1998 release. Mechner was later able to reacquire the rights to the game, and in 2012, worked with DotEmu to release an iOS port of the title, before making it to Android as well.

MadWorld 

MadWorld is a beat 'em up title for the Wii developed by PlatinumGames and distributed by Sega in March 2009.  The game was purposely designed as an extremely violent video game. The game features a distinctive black-and-white graphic style that borrows from both Frank Miller's Sin City and other Japanese and Western comics. This monotone coloring is only broken by blood that comes from attacking and killing foes in numerous, gruesome, and over-the-top manners. Though there had been violent games available for the Wii from the day it was launched (e.g. No More Heroes and Manhunt 2), many perceived MadWorld as one of the first mature titles for the system, causing some initial outrage from concerned consumers about the normally family-friendly system. MadWorld was well received by critics, but this did not translate into commercial sales; only 123,000 units of the game sold in the United States during its first six months on the market. Sega considered these sales to be "disappointing". Regardless, the game's critical success allowed a pseudo-sequel, Anarchy Reigns, to be produced.

Marvel vs. Capcom: Infinite 

Marvel vs. Capcom: Infinite is the sixth main installment in Capcom's Marvel vs. Capcom series of fighting games that pits Capcom and Marvel's famous characters against each other. When the game was shown at E3 2017, some of the character designs were poorly received, particularly Chun-Li from Street Fighter and Dante from Devil May Cry. The game was also criticized for its lack of X-Men or Fantastic Four characters. Capcom projected that the game would sell two million units by December 31, 2017, but the game launched with a poor showing thanks to the game having a low-budget, which would cause Marvel vs. Capcom: Infinite to generate only half of the projected amount that Capcom gave. Marvel vs. Capcom: Infinites failing would lead to cancellation of DLC, and its exclusion from tournaments such as Evo 2018, as well as Capcom being quiet surrounding the title. The title's failure was also in part due to the competition it received from Bandai Namco's Dragon Ball FighterZ which along with its massive name recognition, took influence from Infinite's two predecessors, Marvel vs. Capcom 2: New Age of Heroes and Ultimate Marvel vs. Capcom 3.

Ōkami 

Ōkami was a product of Clover Studio with direction by Hideki Kamiya, previously known for his work on the Resident Evil and Devil May Cry series. The game is favorably compared to a Zelda-type adventure, and is based on the quest of the goddess-wolf Amaterasu using a "celestial brush" to draw in magical effects on screen and to restore the cursed land of ancient Nippon. Released first in 2006 on the PlayStation 2, it later received a port to the Wii system, where the brush controls were reworked for the motion controls of the Wii Remote. The game was well received by critics, with Metacritic aggregate scores of 93% and 90% for the PlayStation 2 and Wii versions, respectively, and was considered one of the best titles for 2006; IGN named it their Game of the Year. Though strongly praised by critics, fewer than 600,000 units were sold by March 2009.  These factors have led for Ōkami to be called the "least commercially successful winner of a game of the year award" in the 2010 version of the Guinness World Records Gamer's Edition. Shortly after its release, Capcom disbanded Clover Studio, though many of its employees went on to form PlatinumGames and produce MadWorld and the more successful Bayonetta. Strong fan support of the game led to a sequel, Ōkamiden, on the Nintendo DS, followed by a high-definition remaster for the PlayStation 3, PlayStation 4, Xbox One, Nintendo Switch and Microsoft Windows.

The Osu! Tatakae! Ouendan series 

After developing the rhythm game Gitaroo Man, iNiS Corporation began work on a more innovative one for the Nintendo DS that was based on an idea from founder Keiichi Yano, in which players would tap and drag on-screen targets in time with music to help an oendan cheer up people who are in trouble so that they can overcome their problems, which Nintendo released as Osu! Tatakae! Ouendan.  The game received positive reviews, leading to plans to develop a localized and upgraded reskin of the game titled Elite Beat Agents, as well as a sequel, Moero! Nekketsu Rhythm Damashii Osu! Tatakae! Ouendan 2.  Despite all three games being praised by critics, none of them were commercially successful, all selling less than a million copies each.  Poor sales, as well as the uniqueness of their target platform, prevented Nintendo from considering further sequels.

Overkill's The Walking Dead 

Starbreeze Studios had acquired a license in 2014 to develop a game set in The Walking Dead franchise from Skybound Entertainment, using the cooperative gameplay mechanics from Payday: The Heist developed by Starbreeze's subsidiary Overkill Software. The game fell into development hell namely due to demands from Starbreeze to switch game engines, first from the internally-developed Diesel Engine which had been used on the Payday games to the newly developed Valhalla Engine, which Starbreeze had acquired at a large cost, and later to the Unreal Engine after the Valhalla proved too difficult to work with. Having slipped its major release dates twice, the game was completed by November 2018, but which the developers felt was under extreme rush and without sufficient quality review and testing. Overkill's The Walking Dead had mediocre reviews on release to Microsoft Windows, and only 100,000 units were sold within the month. Starbreeze had placed a significant amount of sales expectations behind the game, and with poor sales, the company placed plans to release the game on consoles on hold, and in December 2018 announced that it was restructuring due to a lack of liquidatable assets from the underperformance of Overkill's The Walking Dead. By the end of February 2019, Skybound pulled its licensing agreement from Starbreeze as "ultimately 'Overkill's The Walking Dead' did not meet our standards nor is it the quality that we were promised". Starbreeze officially halted further development of the Windows version and cancelled the game's planned console ports, while Skybound later cancelled the game entirely and pulled the license from Starbreeze. The poor returns on OTWD led Starbreeze to undergo a corporate restructuring from December 2018 to December 2019, laying off staff, selling off publishing and intellectual property rights, and reimplemented paid downloadable content for Payday 2, reneging on an early promise that all such future content would be free.

Psychonauts 

Though achieving notable critical success, including GameSpot's 2005 Best Game No One Played award, Psychonauts sold fewer than 100,000 copies during its initial release. The game led to troubles at publisher Majesco Entertainment, including the resignation of its CEO and the plummeting of the company's stock, prompting a class-action lawsuit by the company's stockholders. At the time of its release in 2005, the game was considered the "poster child" for failures in innovative games. Its poor sales have also been blamed on a lack of marketing. However, today the game remains a popular title on various digital download services. The creator of Psychonauts, Tim Schafer, has a cult following due to his unique and eccentric style. Eventually, Double Fine would go on to acquire the full rights to publishing the game, and, with funding from Dracogen, created a Mac OS X and Linux port of the game, which was sold as part of a Humble Bundle in 2012 with nearly 600,000 bundles sold; according to Schafer, "We made more on Psychonauts [in 2012] than we ever have before." In August 2015, Steam Spy estimated approximately 1,157,000 owners of the game on the digital distributor Steam. Psychonauts was re-released in 2019 for the PlayStation 4 as a Standard Edition and a Collector's Edition, both region free, by publishing company Limited Run Games. A sequel, Psychonauts 2, was partially crowdfunded prior to Double Fine's acquisition by Microsoft who provided additional funding support, and was released in August 2021.

Shenmue and Shenmue II 

Shenmue on the Dreamcast is more notorious for its overambitious budget than its poor sales figures. At the time of release in 1999, the game had the record for the most expensive production costs (over US$70 million), and its five-year production time. In comparison, the games' total sale was 1.2 million copies. Shenmue, however, was a critical hit, earning an average review score of 89%. The game was supposed to be the initial installment of a trilogy. The second installment was eventually released in 2001, but by this time the Dreamcast was floundering, so the game only saw a release in Japan and Europe. Sega eventually released it for North American players for the Xbox, but the poor performance of both titles combined with restructuring have made Sega reluctant to complete the trilogy for fear of failure to return on the investment. However, a Kickstarter campaign has received record support for a third title, with a release originally set for 2018, was eventually released on November 19, 2019. Ports of the first two titles were released in 2018 for PC, Xbox One and PlayStation 4 to re-acclimate players in preparation for the third title's release.

Sonic Boom: Rise of Lyric and Sonic Boom: Shattered Crystal 

Sonic Boom: Rise of Lyric is a spin-off from the Sonic the Hedgehog series, released in 2014 and developed by Big Red Button Entertainment and IllFonic for Sega and Sonic Team, along with its handheld counterpart Sonic Boom: Shattered Crystal, which was developed by Sanzaru Games. Although both games received a negative reception, Rise of Lyric for the Wii U is particularly considered one of the worst video games of all time due to many glitches, poor gameplay and weak writing. Both games failed commercially, selling only 490,000 copies as of February 2015, making them the lowest-selling games in the Sonic franchise. Big Red Button had considered shuttering in the wake of Rise of Lyric underperforming sales alongside its poor reception.

Sonic Runners 

Sonic Runners was a Sonic the Hedgehog game for Android and iOS. A side-scrolling endless runner, it was Sonic Team's first Sonic game that was exclusive to smartphones. It was soft launched in select regions in February 2015 and officially released worldwide in June 2015 to mixed reviews. Although it was downloaded over five million times, the game's publisher, Sega, considered it a commercial failure because it only made between ¥30–50 million a month. As a result, it was discontinued in July 2016. Nintendo Life wrote its failure was proof that the recognizability of a brand does not guarantee success.

Sunset 

Sunset, a first-person exploration adventure game involving a housekeeper working for a dictator of a fictional country, was developed by two-person Belgian studio Tale of Tales, who previously had created several acclaimed arthouse style games and other audio-visual projects such as The Path. They wanted to make Sunset a "game for gamers" while still retaining their arthouse-style approach, and in addition to planning on a commercial release, used Kickstarter to gain funding.  Sunset only sold about 4000 copies on its release, including those to Kickstarter backers. Tale of Tales opted to close their studio after sinking the company's finances into the game, and believed that if they did release any new games in the future, they would likely shy away from commercial release.

System Shock 2 

System Shock 2 was the 1999 sequel to the 1994 immersive sim System Shock. The original game was made by Looking Glass Studios and published by Origin Systems, a subsidiary of Electronic Arts at the time. System Shock was critically praised and had modest sales. Irrational Games was formed in 1997 by three former Looking Glass employees, and Looking Glass approached Irrational about co-developing a game like System Shock, and after several iterations, came to the idea of a direct sequel. System Shock 2 was similarly met with critical praise at release and was named as Game of the Year by several publications, but did not sell well, with only about 58,000 copies selling within eight months of release. For Looking Glass, System Shock 2, similar to Thief: The Dark Project, represent games that they had developed with multi-million dollar budgets that they could not recoup, and due to mounting debt, Looking Glass closed down in May 2000. Irrational wanted to continue to develop in the System Shock series, but Electronic Arts, which owned the intellectual property, felt sales of System Shock 2 failed to meet expectations to justify a sequel. Instead, Irrational set out to develop a game as a spiritual successor to the gameplay concepts of System Shock but without using the property, resulting in their 2007 title BioShock.

Uru: Ages Beyond Myst 

The fourth game in the popular Myst series, released in 2003. It was developed by Cyan Worlds shortly after Riven was completed. The game took Cyan Worlds more than five years and $12 million to complete and was codenamed DIRT ("D'ni in real time"), then MUDPIE (meaning "Multi-User DIRT, Persistent / Personal Interactive Entertainment / Experience / Exploration / Environment"). Though it had generally positive reception, the sales were disappointing. In comparison, the first three Myst games had sold more than 12 million units collectively before Urus release. Urus poor sales were also considered a factor in financially burdening Cyan, contributing to the company's near closure in 2005.

Arcade game failures

I, Robot 

Released by Atari in 1983, I, Robot was the first video game to use 3-D polygon graphics, and the first that allowed the player to change camera angles. It also had gameplay that rewarded planning and stealth as much as reflexes and trigger speed, and included a non-game mode called "Doodle City," where players could make artwork using the polygons. Production estimates vary, but all agree that there were no more than 1500 units made.

Jack the Giantkiller 

In 1982, the President of Cinematronics arranged a one-time purchase of 5000 printed circuit boards from Japan. The boards were used in the manufacture of several games, but the majority of them were reserved for the new arcade game Jack the Giantkiller, based on the classic fairy tale Jack and the Beanstalk. Between the purchase price of the boards and other expenses, Cinematronics invested almost two million dollars into Jack the Giantkiller. It completely flopped in the arcade and many of the boards went unsold, costing the company a huge amount of money at a time when it was already having financial difficulties.

Radar Scope 

Radar Scope was one of the first arcade games released by Nintendo. It was released in Japan first, and a brief run of success there led Nintendo to order 3,000 units for the American market in 1980. American operators were unimpressed, however, and Nintendo of America was stuck with about 2,000 unsold Radar Scope machines sitting in the warehouse.

Facing a potential financial disaster, Nintendo assigned the game's designer, Shigeru Miyamoto, to revamp the game. Instead he designed a brand new game that could be run in the same cabinets and on the same hardware as Radar Scope. That new game was the smash hit Donkey Kong, and Nintendo was able to recoup its investment in 1981 by converting the remaining unsold Radar Scope units to Donkey Kong and selling those.

Sundance 

Sundance was an arcade vector game released in 1979. Producer Cinematronics planned to manufacture about 1000 Sundance units, but sales suffered from a combination of poor gameplay and an abnormally high rate of manufacturing defects. The fallout rate in production was about 50%, the vector monitor (made by an outside vendor) had a defective picture tube that would arc and burn out if the game was left in certain positions during shipping, and according to programmer Tim Skelly, the circuit boards required a lot of cut-and-jumpering between mother and daughter boards that also made for a very fragile setup. The units that survived to reach arcade floors were not a hit with gamers—Skelly himself reportedly felt that the gameplay lacked the "anxiety element" necessary in a good game and asked Cinematronics not to release it, and in an April 1983 interview with Video Games Magazine he referred to Sundance as "a total dog".

See also 
 List of video games notable for negative reception
 List of best-selling video games
 List of films considered the worst
 List of television shows notable for negative reception
 List of video games considered the best

References

External links 
 The Dumbest 25 moments in gaming from GameSpy
 The Silicon Valley 10 & 1 06.16.10: Top 10 Console Failures!

Computer and video gaming
Failure
Commercial failures in video gaming
Commercial failures in video gaming